Anglicana may refer to:

Court hand, a style of handwriting used in medieval English law courts
Anglicana (album), a 2002 release by English folk musician Eliza Carthy